The Metropolitan Borough of Woolwich was a metropolitan borough in the County of London from 1900 to 1965. It was formed from the civil parishes of Eltham, Plumstead and Woolwich. Its former area is now part of the Royal Borough of Greenwich and the London Borough of Newham.

Formation and boundaries
The borough was formed from three civil parishes: Eltham, Plumstead and Woolwich. In 1930 these three were combined into a single civil parish called Borough of Woolwich, which was conterminous with the metropolitan borough.

Previous to the borough's formation it had been administered by three separate local bodies: Lee District Board of Works, Plumstead Vestry and Woolwich Local Board of Health.

Population and area
The population, as recorded at the census, was:

Constituent parishes 1801-1899

Metropolitan Borough 1900-1961

Politics
The borough was divided into eleven wards for elections: Burrage, Central, Dockyard, Eltham, Glyndon, Herbert, River, St George's, St Margaret's, St Mary's and St Nicholas.

Borough council

Parliament constituency
For elections to Parliament, the borough was represented by one constituency:
Woolwich
In 1918, the borough's representation was increased to two seats:
Woolwich East
Woolwich West

Abolition
Most of it was amalgamated with the Metropolitan Borough of Greenwich to form the London Borough of Greenwich, but small parts north of the river, including North Woolwich, were instead included in the London Borough of Newham.

References

Further reading
 

Metropolitan boroughs of the County of London
History of the Royal Borough of Greenwich
1900 establishments in the United Kingdom
1965 disestablishments in the United Kingdom
Metropolitan Borough of
Districts abolished by the London Government Act 1963